"Over and Over" is a song by American rapper Nelly featuring American country music singer Tim McGraw. The lyrics were written by Nelly while the music was written and produced by James D. "Sted-Fast" Hargrove II and Jayson "KoKo" Bridges. Other musicians who contributed to the recording include Bryan Loss (drums) and Matthew Brauss (bass guitar). The lyrics of the song focus on regret.

"Over and Over" was released on September 12, 2004, as the second single from Nelly's fourth album, Suit, two days before Sweat and Suit went on sale in stores. The song peaked at number three on the US Billboard Hot 100. Outside the United States, the single topped the charts of Australia, Canada, Ireland, and the United Kingdom, and it peaked within the top 10 of the charts in eight European countries and New Zealand. It was received positively by music critics, who gave most praise to McGraw's vocal performance.

Critical reception
Rashaun Hall of Billboard wrote that "Over and Over" possesses "real emotion" and praised Tim McGraw's "moving" lyrics. Jason Birchmeier of AllMusic also complimented McGraw's hook, saying that it "works much better than it should."

Commercial performance
"Over and Over" was a success on the US Billboard Hot 100, reaching number three on December 4, 2004, and spending 24 weeks on the chart. On the Billboard Mainstream Top 40, the song peaked at number one and set multiple records, including the biggest jump to number one (7–1), the quickest climb to the top spot (four weeks), and the biggest airplay increase for a number-one song (1,783 detections). It also reached number one on the Rhythmic chart and entered the top 20 on the Adult Top 40 and Hot Rap Songs listings. It was the 96th-most-successful song of the US in 2004 and the 48th-most-successful song of the following year, earning a platinum certification from the Recording Industry Association of America in 2009. The song was a radio hit in Canada, peaking at number one on the Radio & Records CHR/Pop Top 30 chart.

In Europe, "Over and Over" topped the charts of Ireland and the United Kingdom. In the latter country, it stayed on the UK Singles Chart for 15 weeks and was ranked at number 25 on the year-end chart for 2005. It was certified silver in 2013 for shipping over 200,000 copies in the UK. Across continental Europe, the single entered the top 10 in Austria, the Czech Republic, Denmark, Germany, Hungary, Romania, and Switzerland, achieving a peak of number two on the Eurochart Hot 100. It additionally topped the Australian Singles Chart, staying at the top for five weeks, earning a double-platinum certification, and finishing in fifth place on Australia's year-end chart for 2005. In New Zealand, it reached a peak of number two on February 14, 2005, and was the year's 29th-best-selling hit.

Music video
The music video was directed by Erik White and Nelly himself. During the video, Nelly and McGraw sing individually on split screen. It starts with Nelly and Tim both waking up at 5:30 A.M., both taking showers, and both leaving their houses & getting into vehicles. Nelly has photos of Ciara on his nightstand and in his car, and McGraw has photos of Faith Hill. The settings feature similar scenes of them encountering fans at gas stations, traveling, and making visits to the airport, all the while both preoccupied with their respective significant others. In the end, they both depart on separate but comparable private jets, possibly to meet up with the women they have been singing about throughout the video.

Track listings

US promo CD
 "Over and Over" (album version) – 4:14
 "Over and Over" (instrumental) – 4:14

European CD single
 "Over and Over" (album version) – 4:14
 "Over and Over (Moox Suit Remix) – 3:26

UK CD single
 "Over and Over" – 4:14
 "Over and Over" (Moox Suit Remix) – 3:26
 "Getcha Getcha" feat. St. Lunatics – 4:37
 "Over and Over" (video)

UK 12-inch single
A1. "Over and Over" – 4:14
A2. "Over and Over" (Moox Suit Remix) – 3:26
B1. "Getcha Getcha" feat. St. Lunatics – 4:37
B2. "Over and Over" (instrumental) – 4:14

Australasian CD single
 "Over and Over" – 4:14
 "Over and Over" (Moox Suit Remix) – 3:26
 "Getcha Getcha" feat. St. Lunatics – 4:37
 "Hot in Herre" (remix) – 3:45

Credits and personnel
Credits are taken from the US promo CD liner notes.

Studios
 Recorded at The Record Plant (Los Angeles) and Basement Beats (St. Louis)
 Mixed at Platinum Sound Recording (New York City)
 Mastered at Sterling Sound (New York City)

Personnel

 Nelly – lyrics, main vocalist
 Jayson "KoKo" Bridges – music, percussion, production
 James D. "Sted-Fast" Hargrove II – music, guitar production
 Tim McGraw – featured vocalist
 Matthew Brauss – bass guitar
 Bryan Loss – drums

 Carl Nappa – recording
 Mike Eleopoulos – recording assistant
 Rich Travali – mixing
 Chip Karpells – mixing assistant
 Chris Gehringer – mastering
 Kevin Law – A&R direction

Charts

Weekly charts

Year-end charts

Decade-end charts

Certifications

Release history

See also
 List of number-one singles in Australia in 2005
 List of number-one singles of 2005 (Ireland)
 List of number-one singles from the 2000s (UK)
 List of Mainstream Top 40 number-one hits of 2004 (U.S.)

References

2004 singles
2004 songs
Country rap songs
Curb Records singles
Irish Singles Chart number-one singles
Male vocal duets
Music videos directed by Sherman Halsey
Nelly songs
Number-one singles in Australia
Number-one singles in Scotland
Tim McGraw songs
UK Singles Chart number-one singles
Universal Records singles